James Bernard Bowler (February 5, 1875 – July 18, 1957) was an American politician from Chicago, Illinois. He served three terms as a United States Representative for Illinois. Elected at age 78, Bowler is the second oldest person to win his first election to Congress, after William Lewis of Kentucky.

Early life
Bowler was born in Chicago, Illinois on February 5, 1875. He attended the parochial and public schools of Chicago, and was a professional bicycle endurance rider and racer before running for Alderman. He later became involved in the insurance business and was the owner of several race horses, both ventures he acquired from the family of John Coughlin following Coughlin's death.

Career

Chicago politics
He became an Alderman (City Councilman) for Chicago's 19th Ward in 1906, serving alongside John Powers. When Anthony D'Andrea ran against Bowler in 1916, the violence during the election sparked the five-year-long Aldermen's Wars, which saw thirty political operatives killed.

Bowler served on the Chicago City Council until 1953, with hiatuses from 1923 to 1927 when he served as Chicago's Commissioner of Compensation, and in 1934, when he was Chicago's Commissioner of Vehicle Licenses. He served as chairman of several committees, including Rules and Finance, and was the council's President pro tempore for eight years. His 42 years on the City Council made him one of the longest-serving Aldermen in Chicago history. From 1927–1934 and 1945–1953, he was the alderman from the 25th Ward.

Bowler was chairman of the City Council's remapping committee in 1923 when it became apparent that the fairest map would redistrict him out of his own 19th Ward. Without hesitation, he proceeded to remap himself out of the City Council. Four years later, he ran in the new ward in which he found himself residing, the 25th, and won.

Congress
In 1953, he became a U.S. Representative for Illinois' 7th District. He was elected as a Democrat to the Eighty-third Congress to fill the vacancy caused by the death of Adolph J. Sabath. He was reelected to the Eighty-fourth and Eighty-fifth Congresses and served from July 7, 1953, until his death.

During his later years, Bowler suffered from arthritis and other ailments, and walked with the aid of a cane. During his final term, he was confined to a hospital bed and unable to attend House sessions, and his oath of office was administered in Chicago by Congressman Charles A. Boyle.

Bowler is considered to have been one of the five individuals most responsible for pushing through legislation that helped fund the building of the Congress Street (now Eisenhower) Expressway in Chicago. He also was instrumental in creating the Illinois Medical District in Chicago, which contains several hospitals and other healthcare providers.

Personal life

In 1905, Bowler was appearing in Salt Lake City as a member of a bicycle racing team when he married Anastasia V. Sweeney of Chicago, who had traveled to Salt Lake City for the ceremony.

Bowler died in Chicago on July 18, 1957. He had been ill for several years following a heart attack and suffered from complications from arthritis. He was buried at All Saints Cemetery, Des Plaines, Illinois.

See also
List of United States Congress members who died in office (1950–99)

References

Sources

Books

Newspapers

External links

1875 births
1957 deaths
Chicago City Council members
Democratic Party members of the United States House of Representatives from Illinois
American male cyclists
Cyclists from Illinois